Scott Martin (born 12 October 1982 in Wodonga, Victoria) is an Australian shot putter and discus throw competitor. He rose to prominence in a National Australia Bank advertisement promoting the 2006 Commonwealth Games; in the ad, Martin was shown taking part in a ballet class to improve his discus technique. He won a bronze medal in the men's shot put at the Games, and won gold in the men's discus throw.

Scott Martin is currently the Australian and Oceania record holder with a throw of 21.26 metres in the Melbourne leg of the World Athletics Tour meeting in February 2008. He beat the previous record held by Justin Anlezark at 20.96 metres.

In addition he is the 2006 Australian Shot Put champion, and he is a three-time discus champion (2004–06). Martin is currently managed by the Australian arm of Athletes1, whose Director is Rick Olarenshaw.

He competed at the 2008 Beijing Olympics in the shot put and 2012 London Olympics at the discus but failed to progress beyond the qualifying stage on both occasions.

Achievements
All results regarding shot put, unless stated otherwise

References 
 
 Athletics Australia profile
 National Australia Bank profile

External links
 

1982 births
Living people
Australian male shot putters
Australian male discus throwers
Athletes (track and field) at the 2008 Summer Olympics
Athletes (track and field) at the 2012 Summer Olympics
Olympic athletes of Australia
Athletes (track and field) at the 2006 Commonwealth Games
Athletes from Melbourne
Commonwealth Games gold medallists for Australia
World Athletics Championships athletes for Australia
Commonwealth Games medallists in athletics
People from Wodonga
Oceanian Athletics Championships winners
Medallists at the 2006 Commonwealth Games